Pietrosu (meaning "rocky") may refer to several places in Romania:

 Pietrosu, a village in Costești Commune, Buzău County
 Pietrosu, a village in Tătăruși Commune, Iași County
 Pietrosu, a village in Oniceni Commune, Neamț County

and to a village in Moldova:
 Pietrosu, Fălești, a commune in Fălești district

and three mountain peaks in Romania:
Pietrosu Peak (Rodna), Rodna Mountains, Maramureș County (2303 m)
Pietrosu Peak (Călimani), Călimani Mountains, Suceava/Mureș County (2100 m)
Pietrosu Peak (Bistrița), Bistrița Mountains, Suceava County (1791 m)

and the following rivers in Romania:
 Pietrosu, a tributary of the Bârzava in Caraș-Severin County
 Pietrosu, a tributary of the Cracăul Alb in Neamț County
 Pietrosu, a tributary of the Dobrovăț in Iași County
 Pietrosu, a tributary of the Orăștie in Hunedoara County
 Pietrosu, a tributary of the Păscoaia in Vâlcea County

See also
 Pietrosul (disambiguation)
 Pârâul Pietros (disambiguation)